Andrew Robert Heck (born January 1, 1967) is an American football coach and former player. He is the offensive line coach for the Kansas City Chiefs. He played tackle in the National Football League (NFL) for twelve seasons. He was drafted in the 1989 NFL Draft with the 15th overall selection in the first round by the Seattle Seahawks He played college football at the University of Notre Dame. He also played for the Chicago Bears and Washington Redskins.

Early life
Heck was born in Fargo, North Dakota. He attended W.T. Woodson High School in Fairfax, Virginia, a suburb southwest of Washington, D.C.

College career
He received a scholarship to play football at the University of Notre Dame, where, as a co-captain, he helped lead the Fighting Irish to a national championship in 1988 under head coach Lou Holtz.

NFL career

Seattle Seahawks
Heck was a first round selection of the Seattle Seahawks in the 1989 NFL Draft, the fifteenth overall pick, and signed a five-year contract exceeding $2.7 million following a one-week holdout.

Chicago Bears
Heck signed with the Chicago Bears on February 23, 1994 for $10 million over four years.  After five seasons, Heck was released in June 1999.

Washington Redskins
Heck signed with the Washington Redskins in 1999. He played two seasons with the Redskins.

Coaching career

Early Jobs
Heck moved into coaching and spent three years at the University of Virginia in Charlottesville, starting with two years as a graduate assistant.

Jacksonville Jaguars
Heck was hired as the Jacksonville Jaguars assistant offensive line coach in 2004. In 2006, he was promoted to offensive line coach.

Kansas City Chiefs
Heck was hired by the Kansas City Chiefs in 2013 as their offensive line coach. In 2019, he won his first Super Bowl when the Chiefs defeated the San Francisco 49ers 31-20 in Super Bowl LIV. In 2022, Heck won his second Super Bowl when the Chiefs defeated the Philadelphia Eagles 38-35 in Super Bowl LVII.

Personal life
Heck's son Charlie Heck plays American football as an offensive tackle for the Houston Texans, after being drafted in the 2020 NFL Draft.

References

External links
 

1967 births
Living people
American football offensive guards
American football offensive tackles
Chicago Bears players
Jacksonville Jaguars coaches
Kansas City Chiefs coaches
Notre Dame Fighting Irish football players
Sportspeople from Fairfax County, Virginia
Sportspeople from Fargo, North Dakota
Seattle Seahawks players
Virginia Cavaliers football coaches
Washington Redskins players
Wilbert Tucker Woodson High School alumni